Piyush Gupta  (born 24 January 1960) is a Singaporean banker currently serving as the chief executive officer, and director of DBS Group, the largest bank in Southeast Asia by total assets. He is also vice-chairman of the Institute of International Finance, and a board member of Enterprise Singapore.

Early life and education 
Gupta was one of three children, born in Meerut, India, to R.S. Gupta and Minnie Gupta. He attended St. Columba's High School before going on to pursue a Bachelor of Arts (Honours) degree in economics from St. Stephen's College, Delhi. After graduating, he enrolled at the Indian Institute of Management, Ahmedabad for his postgraduate diploma in management.

Professional career

Career 
In 1982 and at the age of 22, Gupta started his career at Citibank India as a management trainee. He did several assignments with Citibank India, eventually being the chief-of-staff to the India head. He moved to Singapore in 1991 as the chief-of-staff to the Asia head, and was posted to Indonesia in 1998, as country manager. In 2000, he left Citigroup to start up a dot-com company, but closed his venture and re-joined Citigroup in 2001. Gupta was country officer in Malaysia from 2002 to 2007, where he helped built up Citigroup's branch network, before assuming the role of country officer in Singapore and the head of the Corporate and Investment Bank in ASEAN. In 2008, Gupta was appointed the chief executive officer of Citibank in South East Asia, Australia and New Zealand. 

In 2009, he left Citigroup to join DBS Group as the chief executive officer. As CEO, he received various business awards, and has been credited with growing DBS to become a leading Asian financial services group. Early on in 2013, Gupta also realized that DBS needed to start thinking like big tech. “Our frame of reference had to be Amazon or Alibaba. We had to stop thinking about what others banks will do. We had to start thinking about what big tech will do.”  This has prompted a culture of pervasive experimentation and innovation at DBS, leading to it being named “one of the most transformed companies” of the last decade. In 2020, he led DBS to launch two new exchanges, and undertake two acquisitions. 

Gupta has come out with the importance of future blockchain driven Web 3.0 world with the cautious conclusion at a panel discussion titled, Global Trends and Web 3.0 at the Singapore FinTech Festival in 2021.

Now, the problem with Web 3.0 is when you take that argument to the next phase, it’s not only the intermediaries you start questioning. You don’t need a central bank. You don’t need the regulators. And by the way, guess what, you don’t need nation states. You don’t need governments. And then you start getting into this thing that is not a question of technology. That’s a question of social politics, and a question of philosophy. Do we as mankind prefer to live in a world where eight billion of us are individual agents, without any organising principles such as countries, states, central banks, regulators and boundary keepers? I would argue that it is very, very hard for us to get there.

Personal life 
Gupta enjoys reading and bird watching. He plays golf and badminton, and does crosswords. He is an ambassador for CanKids India, a non-governmental organisation that supports victims of childhood cancer. His wife, Ruchira, is a physiotherapist.

A long-time permanent resident of Singapore, Gupta was naturalized as a Singapore citizen in 2009. Gupta also possesses an Overseas Citizenship of India, a form of permanent residency for former citizens of India.

References

External links 
 Profile at DBS Bank
 Executive profile at Businessweek
 Piyush Gupta collected news and commentary at Bloomberg
 Piyush Gupta collected news and commentary at The Wall Street Journal

Living people
1960 births
Singaporean business executives
Singaporean chief executives
Indian Institute of Management Ahmedabad alumni
St. Stephen's College, Delhi alumni
DBS Bank people